Feodor Mikhailovich Rtishchev (April 16, 1625, Chekalinsky uyezd – July 1, 1673, Moscow) was a boyar and an intimate friend of Alexis I of Russia who was renowned for his piety and alms-deeds. He was the founder of the so-called Andreevsky School. It was the first educational institution in Russia, founded as a court circle during the reign of Alexei Mikhailovich. 

As Rtischev eschewed publicity, the true extent of his influence on the Tsar's policies has been disputed by historians. It is thought that it was Rtischev who instigated the revision of service-books which led to the Great Schism of the Russian Orthodox Church. Some scholars also hold him responsible for the eventual downfall of Patriarch Nikon.

During the great famine in Vologda (1650), Rtischev sold much of his property, including clothes and house utensils, in order to raise funds for the famine-stricken city. He took care for all the wounded in the Russo-Polish wars, notwithstanding their nationality, and established several alms-houses in Moscow.

Remembered as the earliest patron of Russian education, Rtischev founded one of the first schools in Moscow, where he invited Yepifany Slavinetsky to  instruct the students in Greek language. Rtischev's school would later be transformed into the Slavic Greek Latin Academy.

It is known that Rtischev survived several assassination attempts, and wrote a treatise on falconry. His biography was written by Vasily Klyuchevsky.

Fyodor was a relative of Ustinia Bogdanovna Rtishcheva and her daughter Eudoxia Lopukhina. Eudoxia was chosen by Natalia Naryshkina as the first Tsarina for her son Peter I of Russia due to her relation to Fyodor.

References 

Tsardom of Russia people
Russian philanthropists
Russian Orthodox Christians from Russia
Russian nobility
1626 births
1673 deaths
17th-century philanthropists